American Outlook is an American quarterly public policy magazine that discusses the pressing issues of current events. The first issue of the magazine appeared in September 1998. Published by Sagamore Institute of Indianapolis, Indiana, American Outlook is available in hard copy and online.

Staff
Jay F. Hein: editor in chief
Wesley Cate: managing editor
Beverly Saddler: production assistant

References

External links
American Outlook Website

1998 establishments in the United States
Biannual magazines published in the United States
Conservative magazines published in the United States
Magazines established in 1998
Magazines published in Indianapolis
Quarterly magazines published in the United States